This is a list of rivers in Guyana.

By drainage basin
This list is arranged by drainage basin, with respective tributaries indented under each larger stream's name.

Atlantic Ocean

Amazon River (Brazil)
Negro River (Brazil)
Branco River (Brazil)
Takutu River
Ireng River
Courantyne River
Kutari River
Coeroeni River
New River (South America)
Oronoque River
Berbice River
Canje River
Abary River
Mahaicony River
Mahaica River
Demerara River
Haiama River
Haianari Creek
Haiakwa Creek
John River
Madawini
Kamuni
Hauraruni
Tenabu
Madabadeen

Essequibo River
Mazaruni River
Kako River
Kukui
Kamarang River
Eping River
Issineru River
Meamu River
Kurupung River
Merume River
Puruni River
Cuyuni River
Akarabisi
Arimu River
Ekereku River
Iroma
Akarabisi
Kopang
Oko River
Wenamu River
Akaiwang River
Potaro River
Arnik River
Kuribrong River
Konawaruk River
Siparuni River
Burro-Burro River
Rupununi River
Rewa River
Kwitaro River
Kuyuwini River
Kassikaityu River
Pomeroon River
Wakapau River
Moruka River
Waini River
Barama River
Orinoco River (Venezuela)
Barima River
Kaituma River
Amacuro River (Amakura River)

See also
List of rivers of the Americas by coastline

References

Bibliography 
Rand McNally, The New International Atlas, 1993.

External links

Guyana
 
Rivers